Umberto Marcheggiani (born 12 June 1943) is an Italian former wrestler who competed in the 1968 Summer Olympics and in the 1972 Summer Olympics.

References

External links
 

1943 births
Living people
Olympic wrestlers of Italy
Wrestlers at the 1968 Summer Olympics
Wrestlers at the 1972 Summer Olympics
Italian male sport wrestlers